Actinotus laxus is a small plant in the Apiaceae family, endemic to the southwest coast of Western Australia.

It has no synonyms.

Description
Actinotus laxus is a perennial herb growing to 0.4 m high and may either straggle or grow as a slender erect plant. The flowering branches are long and slender and the inflorescences are very small. Its white to cream flowers may be seen in December or from January to March.

Habitat 
It grows on sandy, peaty, or clayey soils and usually in fresh-water permanent swamps.

Taxonomy
It was first described by Gregory John Keighery in 1999.

References

External links
Actinotus laxus occurrence data from Australasian Virtual Herbarium

laxus
Eudicots of Western Australia
Taxa named by Gregory John Keighery
Plants described in 1999